Jean-Baptiste Daoust (January 18, 1817 – December 28, 1891) was a Quebec farmer and political figure. He represented Two Mountains (Deux-Montagnes) in the House of Commons of Canada as a Conservative member from 1867 to 1872 and from 1876 to 1891.

He was born in St-Eustache, Lower Canada in 1817. He was elected to the Legislative Assembly of the Province of Canada for Deux-Montagnes in 1854 as a Reformer and served until his resignation in 1866. He was prefect for the county of Deux-Montagnes for several years and also served as commissioner for the small claims court. Daoust also served as lieutenant in the local militia. In 1867, he was elected to the 1st Canadian Parliament but did not run in 1872 or 1874. He served as deputy warden for penitentiaries in Quebec from 1872 to 1875. He was elected again in an 1876 by-election after the sitting member resigned and continued to be reelected until he died in office in 1891.

Electoral record 

According to Canadian Directory of Parliament, 1867–1967, p. 234., this by-election did not occur and Mr. Globensky sat until the dissolution of the 3rd Parliament.

See also
 Daoust

External links

 
The Canadian parliamentary companion and annual register, 1889, JA Gemmill

1817 births
1891 deaths
Members of the Legislative Assembly of the Province of Canada from Canada East
Conservative Party of Canada (1867–1942) MPs
Members of the House of Commons of Canada from Quebec
People from Saint-Eustache, Quebec